Humble Pi is a collaborative studio album by Homeboy Sandman & Edan. It was released on Stones Throw Records on October 26, 2018.

Music videos
Music videos were created for "Grim Seasons", "#Neverusetheinternetagain", and "The Gut".

Critical reception

Paul Simpson of AllMusic said, "Edan's fetish for echo and obscure acid rock records is as evident as ever through his mind-bending productions, and Sandman's effortlessly complex lyrics are typically biting as well as insightful." Dean Van Nguyen of Pitchfork commented that "Humble Pi might be thin, but there's enough here to spark hope that this is the origin point of Sandman and Edan's cracked journey, and not the final destination." Nate Patrin of Bandcamp Daily described it as "a short but vivid world building record, the remnants of old places and past lives still standing in defiance of hyper development."

"Grim Seasons" was placed at number 2 on  Stereogums "5 Best Songs of the Week" list on August 3, 2018.

Track listing

References

External links
 

2018 albums
Stones Throw Records albums
Homeboy Sandman albums
Edan (musician) albums